Alexander Metzler (January 4, 1903 – November 30, 1973) was an outfielder in Major League Baseball from 1925 to 1930. He played for the Chicago Cubs, Philadelphia Athletics, Chicago White Sox, and St. Louis Browns.

In 560 games over six seasons, Metzler posted a .285 batting average (561-for-1968) with 290 runs, 85 doubles, 41 triples, 9 home runs, 206 RBI, 45 stolen bases, 260 bases on balls, .374 on-base percentage and .384 slugging percentage. He finished his career with a .965 fielding percentage playing at all three outfield positions.

References

External links

1903 births
1973 deaths
Major League Baseball outfielders
Chicago Cubs players
Philadelphia Athletics players
Chicago White Sox players
St. Louis Browns players
Baseball players from California
Sportspeople from Fresno, California
Ardmore Boomers players
Dallas Steers players
Milwaukee Brewers (AA) players
Paris North Stars players
Portland Beavers players
Shreveport Sports players
Wichita Falls Spudders players